In additive combinatorics, the Ruzsa triangle inequality, also known as the Ruzsa difference triangle inequality to differentiate it from some of its variants, bounds the size of the difference of two sets in terms of the sizes of both their differences with a third set. It was proven by Imre Ruzsa (1996), and is so named for its resemblance to the triangle inequality. It is an important lemma in the proof of the Plünnecke-Ruzsa inequality.

Statement 
Similarly,  denotes . Then, the Ruzsa triangle inequality states the following.

An alternate formulation involves the notion of the Ruzsa distance.

Definition.

Then, the Ruzsa triangle inequality has the following equivalent formulation:

This formulation resembles the triangle inequality for a metric space; however, the Ruzsa distance does not define a metric space since  is not always zero.

Proof
To prove the statement, it suffices to construct an injection from the set  to the set . Define a function  as follows. Therefore,

completing the proof.

Variants of the Ruzsa triangle inequality

The Ruzsa sum triangle inequality is a corollary of the Plünnecke-Ruzsa inequality (which is in turn proved using the ordinary Ruzsa triangle inequality). 

Proof. The proof uses the following lemma from the proof of the Plünnecke-Ruzsa inequality.

Lemma. Let  and  be finite subsets of an abelian group .

If  is the empty set, then the left side of the inequality becomes , so the inequality is true. Otherwise, let  be a subset of  that minimizes . Let . The definition of  implies that  Because , applying the above lemma gives
 
Rearranging gives the Ruzsa sum triangle inequality.

where all eight possible configurations of signs hold. These results are also sometimes known collectively as the Ruzsa triangle inequalities.

References 

Additive combinatorics